Eugene Meyer may refer to:

 Eugene Meyer (financier) (1875–1959), American financier, public official, and Washington Post publisher
 Marc Eugene Meyer (1842–1925), Franco-American businessman, father of Eugene Isaac Meyer 
 Eugène Meyer (inventor) (19th century), French mechanic credited with making important contributions to the development of the bicycle
 Eugene B. Meyer, president of the Federalist Society

See also
Eugene Myers (born 1953), American computer scientist
Eugene Mayer (1892–1918), American football player